The Pleasure Seekers is the third album recorded by American band The System, released in the United States under the Mirage-Atlantic label.

Description
The album was produced by its band members, namely David Frank and Mic Murphy. Commercially successful singles from this album include "The Pleasure Seekers" and "This Is for You".

The album entered the Billboard  R&B Albums chart in 1985.

Guest vocals on "The Pleasure Seekers" song include Audrey Wheeler of Unlimited Touch.

Track listing 
All songs written by Frank and Murphy.

Production
Engineer: Tom Lord-Alge
Mixing: Tom Lord-Alge
Art direction: Bob Defrin
Mastering: Dennis King
Photography: Roy Volkmann
Assistant technician: Acar Key

Personnel
Paul Pesco - electric guitar
Jimmy Maelen - percussion
David Frank - producer, keyboards, arrangements
Mic Murphy - producer, vocals, arrangements

Chart positions

References

1985 albums
The System (band) albums
Mirage Records albums